Hamilton Lake is a residential suburb of Hamilton, surrounding Lake Rotoroa and the Hamilton Lake Domain. Most of the housing in the suburb was built in the 1970s. The roads close to the lake are considered to be amongst Hamilton's premium streets.

Demographics

Hamilton Lake had a population of 3,483 at the 2018 New Zealand census, an increase of 273 people (8.5%) since the 2013 census, and an increase of 429 people (14.0%) since the 2006 census. There were 1,344 households, comprising 1,722 males and 1,761 females, giving a sex ratio of 0.98 males per female. The median age was 34.1 years (compared with 37.4 years nationally), with 495 people (14.2%) aged under 15 years, 978 (28.1%) aged 15 to 29, 1,566 (45.0%) aged 30 to 64, and 441 (12.7%) aged 65 or older.

Ethnicities were 65.8% European/Pākehā, 18.8% Māori, 4.6% Pacific peoples, 21.0% Asian, and 3.2% other ethnicities. People may identify with more than one ethnicity.

The percentage of people born overseas was 30.0, compared with 27.1% nationally.

Although some people chose not to answer the census's question about religious affiliation, 46.8% had no religion, 35.9% were Christian, 0.8% had Māori religious beliefs, 4.0% were Hindu, 1.6% were Muslim, 0.5% were Buddhist and 4.6% had other religions.

Of those at least 15 years old, 963 (32.2%) people had a bachelor's or higher degree, and 357 (11.9%) people had no formal qualifications. The median income was $35,600, compared with $31,800 nationally. 558 people (18.7%) earned over $70,000 compared to 17.2% nationally. The employment status of those at least 15 was that 1,596 (53.4%) people were employed full-time, 435 (14.6%) were part-time, and 153 (5.1%) were unemployed.

Education
It was founded in 1911 as Hamilton High School, and become single-sex in 1955 when Hamilton Boys' High School was created.

Notable buildings
Lake House, 102 Lake Crescent, the homestead of the Rukuhia Estate, designed and built in 1873 by Isaac Richardson Vialou, Hamilton's first architect and mayor..
Jolly House (Chateau Windemere), 39 Queen's Avenue, a residence built from 1910.
Water Tower, 18 Ruakiwi Road, a utility building constructed from 1930.

See also 

 List of streets in Hamilton

References

Suburbs of Hamilton, New Zealand